Popovka is a rural locality (a village) in Bogorodskoye Rural Settlement, Ust-Kubinsky  District, Vologda Oblast, Russia. The population was 29 as of 2002.

Geography 
The distance to Ustye is 50 km, to Bogorodskoye is 0.5 km.

References 

Rural localities in Ust-Kubinsky District